The Battle of Neuwied (18 April 1797) saw Lazare Hoche lead part of the French Army of Sambre-et-Meuse against Franz von Werneck's Austrian army. The French attack surprised their enemies and broke through their lines. Aside from 1,000 men killed and wounded, Austrian losses included at least 3,000 prisoners, 24 artillery pieces, 60 vehicles, and five colors. For their part, the French lost 2,000 men killed, wounded, and captured. The losses were in vain because Napoleon Bonaparte signed the Preliminaries of Leoben with Austria the same day. The armistice halted the fighting so that both sides could negotiate a peace. The action occurred during the War of the First Coalition, part of the French Revolutionary Wars.

The battle
The battle opened with an Austrian cannonade causing an attack by the French right wing on the Austrian left wing under Pál Kray. After several attacks against the key position on the Austrian right near the village of Bendorff, the French infantry, aided by several squadrons of chasseurs, were able to dislodge the Austrians from this position. A French cavalry charge drove the Austrians out of the village of Sayn. Hoche then launched a column under Antoine Richepanse in the pursuit of the retreating Austrians. Richepanse succeeded in capturing seven cannons, fifty caissons and five Austrian colors. The French infantry, supported by the guns of François Joseph Lefebvre, managed to dislodge the Austrians from the village of Zolenberg, causing the final defeat of the Austrian left wing.

As the French right wing attacked the Austrian left wing, Hoche launched a second assault, this time on the Austrian center. After an artillery barrage, the grenadiers of General Paul Grenier assaulted the redoubts of Hettersdorff and took the village in a bayonet charge, while the hussars of Michel Ney outflanked the Austrian center position from the left. These attacks forced the Austrian center to retreat.

After being dislodged by Richepanse, the Austrian left was rallied by Kray who was able to withstand further French attacks. To counter this, Hoche launched the grenadiers of Grenier and several squadrons of dragoons and Ney's hussars against Kray. Ney with some 500 hussars proceeded to Dierdorf where he engaged the Austrian reserve of 6,000 for four hours until the rest of the French army caught up.  During a counterattack by Austrian cavalry Ney's horse fell and he was captured. Under this attack the Austrian left collapsed and in the pursuit the hussars captured 4,000 men and two colors. On their part of the battlefield the French left wing under Jean Étienne Championnet succeeded in driving the Austrians out of Altenkirchen and Kerathh.

Result
The Austrian army lost 3,000 men in the battle and another 7,000 men were captured in the aftermath of the battle. The French captured twenty-seven cannon and seven Austrian colors in this major success. Hoche's successful offensive was stopped by news of the Preliminaries of Leoben which led to the Treaty of Campo Formio. The Battle of Neuwied is inscribed on the Arc de Triomphe in Paris.

References

External links
 

Conflicts in 1797
Neuwied 1797
1797 in Austria
1797 in France
Battles of the War of the First Coalition
History of the Rhineland
Battles in Rhineland-Palatinate
1797 in the Holy Roman Empire
Battles inscribed on the Arc de Triomphe